Ryan Henry Ward, who signs his work simply as henry, is an American artist who has been described as "Seattle's most prolific muralist." Publicly active as an artist only since 2008, by the close of 2014, he had painted over 180 murals on surfaces such as buildings exteriors, school interiors, garages, and even vehicles, primarily in the Ballard neighborhood of Seattle, Washington. By his own count, he had sold over 2000 canvases.
Born on a farm in Montana, to Don and Terri Anne Ward, later transplanted to the Pacific Northwest at the age of ten, Ward has lived in a variety of places in the region. As an artist, he began his craft at the age of three, drawing on the walls of his childhood home. He has a deep history of sharing his art with the world. In third grade he had his own comic strip, named Mr. Pib and Ernie, and in fourth grade he began winning art competitions which landed his imagery on T-shirts. He self-published greeting cards throughout his childhood, and in high school began yet another comic strip, The Cheese Life, which was published on the back of Omega Force comic books. Ward grew up mainly in Enumclaw, Washington and attended Fairhaven College of Interdisciplinary Studies at Western Washington University, where he constructed a degree program that mixed writing, art, and storytelling for children. After college, he remained in Bellingham, Washington as a social worker, increasingly working with art therapy. After his older brother and roommate Brandon died 9 September 1999 of heart failure at the age of 25, Ward and his younger brother Andy traveled in India, Nepal, and Thailand.

By 2005, Ward was "burned out" on social work. He and Andy spent two very economically successful years as landscapers. In early 2007, however, Ward had an ATV accident in Moses Lake, Washington, which did damage to his spine from which he still had not fully recovered as of 2011.  Shortly thereafter he decided to paint full-time.

"Ward has only recently created public art. His first four murals were painted during a 2007 visit to the Dominican Republic. Unlike his Seattle art, which tends to feature animals and fantastical creatures, Ward first painted scenes of family life and of people playing instruments."

Although he lived in a bus during his early career as a Seattle artist, Ward now rents an apartment and maintains a studio in the Ballard neighborhood.  In contrast to many other artists on Seattle's "street artist" scene, Ward always executes his public pieces with the permission of the property owner.

Ryan Henry Ward's vision of creating primitive images with a dream-like, surreal quality has come to fruition.  He wants the natural rawness of the painting process to show through his balanced, bright, and whimsical work.

Ward's work has not received a generally favorable reception from Seattle's art critics. Jonathan Walczak characterizes Ward's work as "whimsical", but sums up the critic's verdict on Ward's work as "gooey, meaningless, and annoyingly prevalent." Former Seattle Post-Intelligencer critic Regina Hackett disparaged his "brain-dead cheer". Kevin McKouen, a former gallery owner who represented Ward's work for about a year before his gallery closed, describes it as "lighthearted… but it definitely also has a dark side."

References

External links
 Official website

Artists from Montana
Living people
Painters from Washington (state)
American muralists
Year of birth missing (living people)
People from Enumclaw, Washington
People from Bellingham, Washington